Damages,  a legal drama television series, premiered in United States on July 24, 2007 on the cable network FX. The series, created and produced by brothers Todd and Glenn Kessler with Daniel Zelman, revolves around Patty Hewes (Glenn Close), a senior partner in New York-based law firm Hewes and Associates, and her protégée Ellen Parsons (Rose Byrne). The series involves high-stakes litigation with class action lawsuits involving severe damages.

The first season of the series debuted on July 24, 2007 and consisted of thirteen episodes concluding on October 23, 2007. The second season was delayed due to the 2007–2008 Writers Guild of America strike, and premiered on January 7, 2009. The season, again consisting of thirteen episodes, ended on April 1, 2009. The third season premiered on January 25, 2010 and aired its finale on April 19, 2010. On July 19, 2010, DirecTV announced that, after months of negotiation, Damages would be picked up for two additional seasons consisting of ten episodes each to be aired on the Audience Network beginning in 2011.

Every episode title is a line of dialogue spoken by a character in the episode.

Series overview

Episodes

Season 1 (2007)

Season 2 (2009)

Season 3 (2010)

Season 4 (2011)

Season 5 (2012)

References

External links
 

Episodes
Lists of American crime drama television series episodes
Lists of legal television series episodes